The 2018 Mercer Tennis Classic was a professional tennis tournament played on outdoor hard courts. It was the sixth edition of the tournament and was part of the 2018 ITF Women's Circuit. It took place in Macon, United States, on 22–28 October 2018.

Singles main draw entrants

Seeds 

 1 Rankings as of 15 October 2018.

Other entrants 
The following players received a wildcard into the singles main draw:
  Christina McHale
  Alexa Guarachi

The following players received entry from the qualifying draw:
  Hailey Baptiste
  Louisa Chirico
  Sanaz Marand
  Giuliana Olmos

Champions

Singles

 Varvara Lepchenko def.  Verónica Cepede Royg, 6–4, 6–4

Doubles

 Caty McNally /  Jessica Pegula def.  Anna Danilina /  Ingrid Neel, 6–1, 5–7, [11–9]

External links 
 2018 Mercer Tennis Classic at ITFtennis.com
 Official website

2018 ITF Women's Circuit
2018 in American sports
Tennis tournaments in the United States